The Madai Vadukunda Shiva Temple is believed to have been constructed by “Kolathiri” Kings during the medieval period on a plateau land generally known now as “Madai Para” in Madai Village, Kannur Taluk, and District of Kerala State. This is situating 22 km north of Kannur, the Headquarters Town. The “Kolathiri” Kingdom is an inherent branch of the erstwhile “Mooshaka” Dynasty, which ruled the “Ezhimala” empire during the 5th to 8th Century. About 1200 years back a branch of their dynasty had migrated and settled down at Madai, which was then an important port and trading center, 4 km south of Ezhimala. They constructed castles and temples and established their headquarters on “Madai Para”, a significant plateau land lying at about 150 ft height from the sea level having sight to an extent of 20 km from all sides. Sree Vadukunda Siva Temple was thus constructed on “Madai Para” in the southwest corner of it at a holy spot due to the presence of the divine power of “Swayambhoo” of lord Siva.

See also
 Temples of Kerala

External links
Vadukandasivan

Hindu temples in Kannur district
Shiva temples in Kerala